The Metropolitan Basketball Association (MBA), or Metroball, was a professional basketball league in the Philippines that ran from March 7, 1998, to July 26, 2002.

History
The MBA played its first game on March 7, 1998, at the Don Narciso Ramos Sports Complex in Lingayen, Pangasinan. Unlike the Philippine Basketball Association, in which teams represent companies, the MBA teams represented a particular city, province or island in the country. The league brought basketball closer to the people, and it raided the PBA for talent.

The MBA was widely viewed as broadcast giant ABS-CBN's attempt to undermine the PBA after failing to snatch its broadcast rights in 1998.

Metroball allowed foreigners to play for their teams, not requiring Philippine passports of them, nor requiring those foreigners to have Filipino blood. All the league required was that these players be born in the Philippines.

As a direct result of this practice, the MBA and its foreign-born players began attracting attention away from the PBA, forcing the PBA to escalate their own players' salaries and practically rendering the PBA draft useless through a "direct hiring" process.

This allowed PBA teams like Talk 'N Text and Tanduay to negotiate directly with MBA players or MBA prospects (like Asi Taulava and Sonny Alvarado) for their services.

However, the league folded on July 26, 2002, due to extremely high expenses on funding a regional basketball league, and most especially when broadcast partner ABS-CBN withdrew funding for the league. Several players went to the semi-professional Philippine Basketball League en route to the PBA.

Season format
The MBA had a season similarly styled to that of the National Basketball Association. The teams were grouped into two conferences: Northern (Luzon and Metro Manila) and Southern (Visayas/Mindanao). The season concluded with the MBA National Finals, where the Northern Conference champion faced the Southern Conference champion to decide the MBA Championship.

After the league adapted a semi-commercial format (teams are sponsored by companies), several methods were used to in determining its champion. In their final season, they have adapted a three-conference format, similar with the PBA.

Teams

Northern Conference
Batangas Blades (1998–2002; team merged with Manila in 2001, known as LBC-Batangas Blades)
Laguna Lakers (1998–2001; team abandoned the league after their owners FedEx joined the PBA in 2002)
Manila Metrostars (1998–2001; team merged with Batangas in 2001)
Nueva Ecija Patriots (1999–2001)
Olongapo Volunteers (2002) (team renamed as Gilbey's-Olongapo Volunteers in 2002)
Pampanga Dragons (also known as Pampanga Stars) (1998–2000; 2002)
Pangasinan Presidents (also known as Pangasinan Waves) (1998–1999; 2002)
Pasig-Rizal Pirates (1998–2000) (also known as Pasig Blue Pirates in 1998)
San Juan Knights (1999–2001) (team renamed as Andok's-San Juan Knights in 2001)

Southern Conference
Cebu Gems (1998–2002; team renamed as the Cebuana Lhullier Gems in 2001)
Davao Eagles (1998–2002)
Cagayan de Oro Amigos (also known as Cagayan de Oro Nuggets) (1998–2000; 2002)
Iloilo Megavoltz (also known as Iloilo Volts) (1998–2000)
Negros Slashers (Bacolod) (1998–2002; team renamed as the RCPI-Negros Slashers in 2002)
SocSarGen Marlins (1998–2001; team renamed as the Socsargen Taguig Marlins in 2001 when the team played its home games in Taguig)
Surigao Miners/Warriors (1999–2000)

Coaches

Louie Alas (Manila, 1999)
Junel Baculi (Olongapo, 2002)
Joel Banal (Pasig-Rizal, 1998–2000)
Rolly Buenaflor (Negros, 1998)
Philip Cezar (San Juan, 1999–2001)
Lawrence Chongson (Pangasinan, 2002)
Ricky Dandan (Manila, 1998)
Aric del Rosario (Pampanga, 1998–1999)
Binky Favis (Batangas, 1998–1999)
Bonnie Garcia (Laguna, 1998–1999, 2001 / Pampanga, 2000)
Danny Gavieres (Iloilo, 1999–2000)
Willie Generalao (Socsargen, 2000)
Bong Go (Davao, 2002)
Jimmy Mariano (Surigao, 2000)
Jun Noel (Negros, 1998-1999 / Davao, 2001)
Nash Racela (Batangas, 2000–2002)
Bong Ramos (Batangas, 2000)

Biboy Ravanes (Socsargen, 1998–1999)
Chot Reyes (Pangasinan, 1999)
Mike Reyes (Iloilo, 1998)
Arlene Rodriguez (Cagayan de Oro, 1999)
Francis Rodriguez (Davao, 1998–2000)
Robert Sison (Pangasinan, 1999 / Negros, 2000–2001)
Leoncio Tan Jr. (Cebu, 1998)
Joe Lipa (Nueva Ecija, 1999–2001)
Allan Trinidad (Nueva Ecija, 2000 / Pampanga, 2002)
Dong Vergeire (Pangasinan, 1998)
Jojo Villa (Nueva Ecija, 2000)
Jojo Villapando (Negros, 2002)
Nemie Villegas (Nueva Ecija, 2000)
Vic Ycasiano (Cagayan de Oro, 2002)
Tonichi Yturri (Cebu, 1998–2002)
David Zamar (Cagayan de Oro, 1998-1999 / Manila, 2000)

Venues

Araullo University Centrum-Cabanatuan
Ateneo Gym
Cebu Coliseum
CEU Centrodome
Centrum in De La Salle-Lipa
General Santos City Gym
Mail & More Complex-San Andres
Mandaue City Sports Complex
Mindanao Polytechnic State College-CDO
Narciso Ramos Sports Complex
Pampanga Convention Center
Pasig Sports Complex

Philsports Arena
Rizal Memorial Coliseum
Rizal Memorial College Stadium
San Fernando Sports Complex
San Juan Gym
San Luis Sports Complex
Tinga Gym-Taguig
University of San Agustin Gym-Iloilo city
University of St. La Salle Gym-Bacolod
Urios Gym-Butuan
Ynares Center

Rules
The MBA had a set of its unique rules compared to the PBA:
 The shot clock was reduced to 23 seconds, as opposed to the PBA's 24 seconds.
 The time limit for a team to advance the ball over the center line was reduced to eight seconds, as opposed to PBA's 10 seconds. The PBA later adopted the 8-second limit in 2004, two years after the MBA disbanded.
 Free-three - An option to trade a player's two free throws for a free three (one attempt at the three-point arc above the free throw line, worth three points if successfully made) at the last two minutes of the fourth quarter. This option was later made available any time during the game by 1999.
 One-for-one situation - There were two penalty situations in the MBA, first is if the team fouls of the opposing team reaches five fouls, the fouled player needed to shoot the first free throw before getting the second. Two free throws were only given to a player if the opposing team incurred seven team fouls.
 Blitz Three - Any field goal converted within five seconds of a change of possession will be worth three points. A red siren is installed at the backboard to indicate the Blitz Period. (introduced in 2001)
 Foreigners were allowed to play in the league, provided that the player is born in the Philippines.

MBA Most Valuable Players

MBA Champions
Teams in bold won the MBA National Championship.

October 31, 1998: Pampanga Dragons emerge as the first MBA champions, winning against Negros Slashers in five games. The Dragons clinch the national championship following an 89–85 victory in Game Five at the San Fernando Sports Complex.
December 8, 1999: Manila Metrostars rout the Cebu Gems, 101–83 in Game Six, before a hometown crowd at the Mail & More Sports Complex in San Andres and crowned themselves the 1999 MBA national champions.
November 25, 2000: San Juan Knights defeated Negros Slashers, 104–91 in Game Six, at the packed San Juan Gym for their first MBA national title since becoming one of the three new teams last season.
August 24, 2001: Andok's-San Juan is champions anew in the MBA first phase tournament, scoring a 3–1 series win over Negros Slashers, the same team they beat in the national finals last year. The Knights outscored the Slashers, 30–15 in the final quarter, for a 103–90 victory.
December 19, 2001: LBC-Batangas Blades captured their first MBA crown in the second phase of the 2001 season, beating hard-luck Negros Slashers, 94–75 in Game Four, for a 3–1 series victory.
June 1, 2002: After four runner-up finishes, RCPI-Negros finally win their first MBA title. The Slashers completed a three-game sweep off LBC-Batangas Blades. Winning Slashers coach Jojo Villapando now joined the elite list of MBA champion coaches.

Key Figures

Commissioners
Ramon Fernandez (1998–1999)
Gregorio "Ogie" Narvasa II (2000–2001)
Severino "Butch" Antonio (2001)
Joaquin "Chito" Loyzaga (2002)

Rivalries
 Manila-Cebu - Seen as a rivalry of two basketball hotbeds in the Philippines. Both teams played the first MBA game on March 7, 1998, in Pangasinan with Metrostars defeating the Gems. Manila and Cebu also entangled in a regular season match in August 1999 which saw Manila escape with a nail-biting win that preserved their record 23-game winning streak. Manila later defeated Cebu in the 1999 MBA National Finals. Cebu bounced back, defeating Manila to win the 2000 MBA Interconference tournament.
 Negros-Cebu - A rivalry of both teams from the Visayas region, and also in the MBA Visayas Division. The Slashers defeated the Gems 4–3 in the 1998 MBA Southern Conference Finals, after Negros trailed 1–3 in the series. The Gems bounced back in the 1999 Southern Conference semis by defeating the Slashers. A game during the series was halted and restarted a week later, due to physical play and fan behavior. Negros bounced back in 2000, defeating Cebu in the Southern finals.
 Davao-Cebu - A Southern Conference rivalry, had a game in 1998 halted due to physical play while fans pelted the court with debris.
 Pasig-San Juan - A Northern Conference rivalry between both nearby Metro Manila cities. Probably the most intense rivalry in MBA history, with games being halted with fights from both players on the court and rival fans in attendance. Pasig-Rizal defeated San Juan to win the 1999 MBA Northern Conference Two title and also eliminated the Knights in the 1999 Northern Conference semifinals.

Trivia
 The Manila Metrostars set a league record in 1999 by winning 22 consecutive games only to be halted by the Negros Slashers during the elimination round, en route to a 26–4 record and the MBA National Championship. The record was also seen by many as the most in Philippine professional basketball history, breaking the PBA's Crispa Redmanizers' record of 21 consecutive victories in 1983.
 Felix Belano of the Davao Eagles was the only player to record a quadruple-double in MBA history (if a player records a double-figure numbers in four categories such as points, rebounds, assists, blocks or steals) during a game against the Nueva Ecija Patriots in 1999. Belano later had a stint with the Talk 'N Text Phone Pals of the PBA.
 Peter Martin made the first shot in the history of the MBA when his Manila Metrostars they faced the Cebu Gems in the opening of the league in 1998.
 The SocSarGen Marlins became the first team to register a win in the first double-header of the league in 1998. Max Delantes led the way for the Marlins.
 Stephen Padilla holds the record for most 3-point shots made with 10 as he scores 40 points with a 10/10 from the 3-point arc in 2001.
 John Ferriols was the first MVP of the tournament while Alex Compton was the first American player to be named MVP of the MBA in 1999.
 In 1999, the Manila Metrostars became the first MBA team to banner a team at the 1999 Southeast Asian Games in Brunei. They made it before winning the national championship over the Cebu Gems. Coach Louie Alas led the RP Team to win the Gold Medal by beating Thailand. The majority of the line-up were the players from the Metrostars led by Adducul and Camaso and recruited some players from other teams.

References

External links
The MBA's Dream Team 2001@servssports.wordpress.com
Long before they became coach and player, Compton, Hontiveros were rivals in epic MBA shootout@spin.ph

 
ABS-CBN Corporation
Sports leagues established in 1998
Organizations disestablished in 2002
Defunct basketball leagues in the Philippines